Stegana is a genus of vinegar flies, insects in the family Drosophilidae
Seven species complexes have been established based on morphological data: S. biprotrusa (Chen & Aotsuka, 2004), S. castanea (Okada, 1988), S. coleoptrata (Scopoli, 1763), S. nigrolimbata (Duda, 1924), S. ornatipes (Wheeler & Takada, 1964), S. shirozui (Okada, 1971) and S. undulata (Meijere, 1911).

See also
 List of Stegana species

References

Drosophilidae genera
Drosophilidae
Taxa named by Johann Wilhelm Meigen